Itajahya galericulata is a species of fungus in the family Phallaceae.

References

External links

Fungi described in 1895
Fungi of Africa
Fungi of Australia
Fungi of North America
Fungi of South America